Frank Bello (born July 9, 1965) is an American musician who plays bass for the thrash metal band Anthrax.

Early life
Bello is the nephew of Anthrax drummer Charlie Benante. He had a younger brother Anthony, who was murdered in the Bronx, New York City, in 1996. His murder was never solved. Bello has a tattoo on his right upper arm with a design of Anthony's face, with the words 'In Memory of Anthony' below it.

Career 

Bello was originally a roadie and guitar technician for Anthrax, but later replaced Dan Lilker soon after the release of the band's 1984 debut album Fistful of Metal, and has held this position ever since, excluding a brief departure in 2004 in order to join Helmet – another New York City-based metal band. His stint in Helmet was brief, as Bello reunited with Anthrax the following year, and (as of 2014) has remained in the band since.

Bello has referred to Steve Harris, Gene Simmons, Geezer Butler, Geddy Lee, Chris Squire and Jaco Pastorius as influences and inspirations to his bass playing.
He mostly plays bass fingerstyle, but also uses a pick on certain songs. For example he can be seen using one in the videos for "Room for One More" and "Fueled". He also used a pick most of the time during his stint with Helmet.

In May 2021, Bello announced the forthcoming publication of his autobiography, Fathers, Brothers, and Sons: Surviving Anguish, Abandonment, and Anthrax. The book's co-writer is British author Joel McIver and it includes a foreword by Gene Simmons of Kiss.

Acting 

Bello played Richard Hell in Greetings from Tim Buckley, a film on Tim and Jeff Buckley, which premiered at the 2012 Toronto International Film Festival.
He also played a small role as a stick-up man in Joe's Apartment, and appeared in the intro scene in the Law & Order episode "The Brotherhood", credited as "Rocker". He also played himself in an episode of Married... with Children and Newsradio.

Equipment

In the early days on Anthrax, Bello used an ESP Precision-styled bass, possibly a 400 series, that had EMG P-bass and J-bass pickups. ESP released this bass as a signature model, available only in Japan, in the mid-to-late 1980s. Sometime during the late 1980s, he switched to an ESP Surveyor P-bass, which had nearly all the same specifications of his previous basses, but with a finished headstock. He began using Fender basses during the beginning of the 1990s, due to a falling out with ESP which, according to ESP Vice President Jeff Moore, was due to miscommunication. He began using Fender P-basses around the time of Persistence of Time until the release of his signature model. Bello had a signature model Fender Jazz bass. The model combines a Fender Aerodyne body with a Precision Bass-width neck, Alder body wood (as opposed to the Aerodyne's Basswood) and a mix of Precision and Jazz bass pickups along with non-standard custom-chosen hardware. Pickups used on the bass are Seymour Duncan SPB-3 precision bass pickup in the neck position and a Samarium Cobalt Noiseless Jazz Bass pickup in the bridge position, although Bello's personal bass now is equipped with EMG HZ Passive pickups which Bello prefers "as the output is... a lot louder" and he gets "a lot more punch". Bello also had a signature Squier electric jazz bass. It features P/J style pick up combination and a skull inlay/body graphic.

The ESP Frank Bello and LTD FB-4 are both based on the ESP Vintage-4 model, customized to Belloʼs specifications with a Black Satin finish and black anodized aluminum pickguard, ebony fingerboard with black pearloid block inlays, EMG PJ-X active pickups and a Gotoh bridge. The basses feature bolt-on construction at 34" scale, an alder body, and maple neck with 21 XJ frets. There is a writing of "R.I.P. Dimebag" on Bello's bass guitar (Fender model) for tribute to deceased Pantera and Damageplan guitarist Dimebag Darrell, which he inscribed into his bass the night of his death. After constant touring with Megadeth's bass player, David Ellefson, Bello switched to a Hartke LH1000 and HyDrive cabinets. On tour, he also use a SansAmp Bass driver for a "grinding tone" for the "Got The Time" song. Previously, he used Ampeg SVT amplifiers and cabinets during the early 1980s, 1990s, and 2000s. During the late 1980s, he used a rack system that relied on a Yamaha PB1 Preamp and Crown Power Base-1 power amplifiers. While in Helmet, Bello used Fender 800-PRO amplifiers with a Sansamp Bass Driver DI distortion pedal.

Philanthropy
Bello has shown support for Little Kids Rock, a national nonprofit that works to restore and revitalize music education in disadvantaged U.S. public schools, by donating several bass guitars and amps to 15 New York City public schools. He also visited a Little Kids Rock classroom to show encouragement to young musicians, answer their questions, and jam with them on their favorite songs.

Discography

References
 Frank Bello Interview at Guitar Video Channel

1965 births
20th-century American guitarists
Anthrax (American band) members
American heavy metal bass guitarists
American male bass guitarists
Helmet (band) members
American people of Italian descent
Living people